The Beta variant, (B.1.351), was a variant of SARS-CoV-2, the virus that causes COVID-19. One of several SARS-CoV-2 variants initially believed to be of particular importance, it was first detected in the Nelson Mandela Bay metropolitan area of the Eastern Cape province of South Africa in October 2020, which was reported by the country's health department on 18 December 2020. Phylogeographic analysis suggests this variant emerged in the Nelson Mandela Bay area in July or August 2020.

The World Health Organization labelled the variant as Beta variant, not to replace the scientific name but as a name for the public to commonly refer to. The WHO considers it to be a variant of concern no longer in circulation.

Names
The variant is also known as the South African variant.

Mutations

There are three mutations of particular interest in the spike region of the lineage B.1.351 genome:
K417N
E484K
N501Y
and a further five spike mutations which have so far generated less concern:
L18F
D80A
D215G
R246I
A701V
Away from the spike region, it also carries: K1655N, SGF 3675-3677 deletion, P71L, and T205I.

Scientists noted that the variant is able to attach more easily to human cells because of three mutations in the receptor-binding domain (RBD) in the spike glycoprotein of the virus: N501Y (a change from asparagine (N) to tyrosine (Y) in amino-acid position 501), K417N, and E484K. Two of these mutations, E484K and N501Y, are within the receptor-binding motif (RBM) of the receptor-binding domain (RBD).

The N501Y mutation has also been detected in the United Kingdom. Two mutations found in the Beta variant, E484K and K417N, are not found in Alpha variant. Also, Beta does not have the 69-70del mutation found in the other variant.

Vaccine efficacy

On 4 January 2021, UK newspaper The Telegraph reported that Oxford immunologist Sir John Bell believed there was "a big question mark" over the new South African variant's potential resistance to COVID-19 vaccines, raising fears that vaccines might not work as effectively on that variant strain. The same day Shabir Madhi, professor of vaccinology at the University of the Witwatersrand, commented to CBS News that "it's not a given" that the new Beta variant (501.V2 variant) would be able to evade the vaccines, but that it should be considered that they "might not have the full efficacy". The additional mutations to the spike protein in Beta were raised as a concerning factor by Simon Clarke, an associate professor in cellular microbiology at the University of Reading, in that they "may make the virus less susceptible to the immune response triggered by the vaccines". Lawrence Young, a virologist at Warwick University, also noted that the variant's multiple spike mutations "could lead to some escape from immune protection".

The E484K amino acid change, a receptor-binding-domain (RBD) mutation, was reported to be "associated with escape from neutralising antibodies" which could adversely affect the efficacy of spike protein-dependent COVID vaccines. The E484K spike mutation was linked to a case of reinfection with the Beta variant of SARS-CoV-2 in Brazil, believed by researchers to be the first such case of reinfection involving this mutation. The possibility of an alteration in antigenicity was referred to as an "escape mutation" from a monoclonal antibody with the capability of neutralizing the spike protein variants of SARS-CoV-2. This suggests that existing vaccines can and should be updated to counter the new strains without recourse to phased trials.

Janssen 
In January, Johnson & Johnson, which held trials for its Janssen (Ad26.COV2.S) vaccine in South Africa, reported the level of protection against moderate to severe COVID-19 infection was 72% in the United States, but 64% in South Africa.

Pfizer–BioNTech 
On 17 February 2021, Pfizer announced that neutralisation activity was reduced by two thirds for the Beta variant, whilst refraining from making claims about the efficacy of the vaccine in preventing illness as a result of this variant.

On 16 March 2021, The South African Health Products Regulatory Authority (SAHPRA) approved the Pfizer-BioNTech vaccine (BNT162b2) for section 21 Emergency Use Authorisation.

On 1 April 2021, an update on a South African vaccine trial stated that the vaccine was 100% effective so far (i.e., vaccinated participants saw no cases), with six of nine infections in the placebo control group being the Beta variant (lineage B.1.351). However, nine days later, an Israeli study found that the variant was present even in people who had received both shots of the vaccine, its prevalence a disproportionate, eight-fold increase amongst vaccinated individuals in comparison to wild strains.

On 5 May 2021, a letter summarizing results from the Qatar National Study Group for COVID-19 Vaccination showed 75% effectiveness against infection, with zero cases of severe disease.

Oxford–AstraZeneca 
On 6 February 2021, The Financial Times reported that provisional trial data from a study undertaken by South Africa's University of the Witwatersrand in conjunction with Oxford University demonstrated reduced efficacy of the Oxford–AstraZeneca COVID-19 vaccine (AZD1222) against the Beta variant. The study found that in a sample size of 2,000 the AZD1222 vaccine afforded only "minimal protection" in all but the most severe cases of COVID-19.

On 7 February 2021, the South African government suspended the planned deployment of around 1 million doses of the vaccine whilst they examined the data and awaited advice on how to proceed. The South African government subsequently cancelled the use of the vaccine, selling its supply to other African countries, and switched its vaccination program to use the Janssen COVID-19 vaccine.

In July 2021, following increased incidence of Beta in France, the United Kingdom - a major user of the AstraZeneca vaccine - placed additional restrictions on people travelling to the UK from France. However, the incidence in France is in its Indian Ocean territory of La Réunion, as pointed out by French politician and doctor Veronique Trillet-Lenoir.

Sinopharm BIBP 
Other African countries have begun the roll out the Sinopharm BIBP vaccine, with Morocco, Egypt, The Seychelles and Zimbabwe starting the mass rollout. So far, the vaccine has proven resistant to the Beta variant, as demonstrated in Zimbabwe. On 2 February 2021, a preprint paper announced that neutralisation activity was reduced by 1.6 fold for the Beta variant.

Moderna 
In February, Moderna reported that the current vaccine (mRNA-1273) produced only one sixth of the antibodies in response to the South African variant compared with the original virus. They have even launched a trial of a new vaccine to tackle the Beta variant.

Sputnik V 
The South African Health Products Regulatory Authority (SAHPRA) has confirmed that it has received documentation for the vaccine developed by the Gamaleya Institute in Russia.

Sputnik V (Gam-COVID-Vac) is one of three Covid vaccines worldwide with an efficacy higher than 90% in symptomatic cases. It was found to be slightly less effective however it worked better than its rivals. A three fold reduction in VNA was found against the beta variant.   A small study of 12 samples published in the nature communications journal showed that the neutralising antibody response was about 6.1 times less against the beta variant.

CoronaVac 
CoronaVac is yet to be approved for use by the South African Health Products Authority (SAHPRA). So far, Sinovac has offered to supply South Africa with 5 million doses of the vaccine.

Covaxin 
Covaxin has been found to be effective against the beta variant although with a three fold reduction in neutralization.

CoviVac 
The CoviVac vaccine Information has not been delivered to the South African government yet.

EpiVacCorona 
The EpiVacCorona vaccine Information has not been delivered to the South African government yet.

ZF2001 
The ZF2001 vaccine Information is in the process of being delivered to the South African government.

Novavax 
A study on the NVX-CoV2373 Novavax vaccine showed 60% efficacy (for HIV-negative participants) in South Africa, compared to 90% efficacy in Britain.

ImmunityBio 
The BioVac Institute, a state-backed South African vaccine company, plans to use a deal it won to manufacture coronavirus vaccines. The contract with American based ImmunityBio Inc is currently conducting phase 1 vaccine trials with their hAd5 vaccine in the United States and South Africa.

ImmunityBio and BioVac plan to distribute the vaccines throughout South Africa and Africa.

Epidemiology
Researchers and officials reported that the prevalence of the variant was higher among young people with no underlying health conditions, and more frequently causes serious illness in such cases than other variants. The South African health department also indicated that the variant may be driving the second wave of the COVID-19 pandemic in the country, as the variant spreads faster than other earlier variants of the virus.

Statistics

History
A genomics team led by the KwaZulu-Natal Research Innovation and Sequencing Platform (KRISP) at the University of KwaZulu-Natal discovered the new variant. It was uncovered by whole genome sequencing. Several genomic sequences from this lineage were submitted to the GISAID sequence database.

On 23 December 2020, UK health minister Matt Hancock announced that two people who had travelled from South Africa to the UK were infected with the Beta variant (501.V2 variant). On 28 December, the variant had been detected in two people in Switzerland and in one in Finland. On 29 December, the strain had been detected in a visitor from South Africa to Japan, and in one overseas traveller to Queensland, Australia. On 30 December the variant was detected in Zambia. On 31 December, it was also detected in France, in a passenger returning from South Africa. On 2 January 2021, the first case of this variant was detected in South Korea. Austria reported their first case of this variant, along with four cases of the Alpha variant on 4 January. The Republic of Botswana also detected their first case on 4 January. The People's Republic of China reported the first case of this variant in southern Guangdong province on 6 January.

On 8 January 2021, the Republic of Ireland reported the detection of 3 cases, all linked to travel from South Africa. On the same day a case of reinfection with the new variant by a woman who had had COVID-19 was reported from Brazil, the first such reinfection reported in the world. Canada reported the first case of this variant in Alberta on 9 January, and Israel reported four cases, all of which were imported in people travelling from South Africa. New Zealand reported the first case of this variant on 10 January.  On 12 January, Germany reported the detection of the mutation in six people from three different households. The same day, it was reported that the United Kingdom had a total of 29 cases, two of which were previously reported. The following day, Belgium reported the first case in a person from West Flanders with no travel history, Israel reported four further cases, and Taiwan reported the first case in a Swazi man in his 30s who had tested positive for COVID-19 on 1 January.

On 14 January, Germany detected a further case and the following day, Canada reported a second case of the mutation which was detected in the Canadian province of British Columbia. A further case was reported in Germany the same day. Denmark and Réunion reported their first cases on 16 January as Israel discovered a further four cases. On 17 January, Israel reported another four cases bringing their total number of cases of this variant to 20. Two further cases were reported in The Netherlands on 18 January bringing the country's total to three. Ghana reported its first case of the variant on 19 January. On 23 January, Panama detected its first case of the strain in a person from Zimbabwe, who had travelled from South Africa. Also on 23 January, Belgium reported at least 15 cases of the variant in Ostend, while 6 cases were confirmed in the Comoros. On 26 January, the Republic of Ireland reported the detection of 6 further cases. The United States reported its first cases of the variant on 28 January 2021, in the state of South Carolina. On 27 January, Israel reported 3 more cases which were the first cases of the variant from samples that were collected in the community randomly, without knowing the source of infection. Preliminary data reported by Africa CDC on 29 January indicated that the variant had reached Ghana. On 31 January, Israel reported its first case of reinfection with the new variant by a man who returned from Turkey.

On 1 February 2021, the United Kingdom Secretary of State for Health and Social Care reported the random detection of 11 cases of the variant where there was no connection to international travel. The same day, the Canadian province of Ontario reported the first case of the variant in the Peel Region, with a similar absence of travel history and no contact with anyone who had recently been abroad. On 8 February, the Republic of Ireland reported the detection of 2 further cases.

On 8 February 2021, Austria detected the greatest outbreak of Beta variant in Europe so far. A total of 293 confirmed cases and 200 suspected cases have been identified through sequencing, most of them will be confirmed in all probability. All of the cases were found in the Tirol region, where nearly 9% of the positive PCR tests were identified as the Beta variant by sequencing. The active cases were estimated at around 140. After a week of public discussion and political pressure about a possible quarantine of Tirol, the government of Austria abstained from isolating the areas of concern, instead making a formal plea to reduce movement in and out of the region and go for testing after visiting Tirol.  Tirolean officials stated their intention to relax the lockdown rules in Tirol in keeping with the rest of Austria.

On 22 February, the Israeli Health Ministry stated that the variant had been genetically sequenced in just under 1% of 3,000 community samples. Later on, Israel reported a total of 444 cases of the variant, making it the highest infection rate in the world outside South Africa. On 25 February, the Republic of Ireland reported the detection of 4 further cases. By late February, Turkey had 49 cases of the Beta variant.

On 3 March 2021, the Philippines confirmed its first 6 new cases of the South African variant, with 3 patients from Pasay with no travel history, and 3 with travel histories from Qatar and UAE. On 5 March 2021, Romania reported its first two cases of the South African variant, coming from two patients in Bucharest and Pitești.

On 23 March 2021, Lithuania confirmed its first 2 new cases of the South African strain, 1 in Kaunas county and 1 in Vilnius. There are 10 more suspected cases of it. The infected people said, that they didn't travel anywhere. On 26 March there were 3 more cases confirmed, which means that virus is successfully spreading inside.

On 1 April 2021, Malaysia detected its first cases of South African variant. The health ministry reported two cases believed to originate from the Jalan Lima cluster, involving an employee based at the Kuala Lumpur International Airport (KLIA), with other reported cases sparsely detected within Selangor. As of 1 April, a total of nine cases involving the variant is reported. By 2 May, a total of 48 cases has been detected in least 5 clusters and from contact tracing, of which 20 were found in two clusters in Perak and Kelantan.

On 12 April 2021 Turkey had 285 cases in 11 provinces.

Extinction 
In March 2022, the World Health Organization listed the Alpha, Beta and Gamma variants as previously circulating citing lack of any detected cases in the prior weeks and months.

See also

 COVID-19 pandemic in South Africa
 COVID-19 vaccination in South Africa
 Variants of SARS-CoV-2: Alpha, Gamma, Delta, Epsilon, Zeta, Eta, Theta, Iota, Kappa, Lambda, Mu, Omicron

Notes

References

External links
 PANGO lineages: New Variant Report - Report on global distribution of lineage B.1.351
 COG-UK Report on SARS-CoV-2 Spike mutations of interest in the UK

COVID-19 pandemic in South Africa
S002